Campsfield House was an immigration detention centre located in Kidlington near Oxford, England, operated by private prison firm Mitie under contract with the British government. It was the site of a number of protests from human rights campaigners and has seen a number of hunger strikes and one suicide. Protests at conditions in the prison have sparked a number of hunger strikes and disturbances. However, it was highly praised by the Chief Inspector of Prisons at the last full inspection. It closed in 2018.

History
Campsfield House used to be a youth detention centre, but it re-opened as an Immigration Detention Centre in November 1993. It originally had 200 places for both male and female prisoners, however in 1997, capacity was reduced to 184 and the prison became male only. The capacity has since risen to 282 bed spaces in 2017. Over 3600 people passed through the centre in 2017, with an average stay of 39 days.

Although the detainee population initially consisted of asylum seekers, since June 2006 new government policy has seen the population change to mainly (an average of 80%) former HMP prisoners.

Until 2011, Campsfield was run by the American private prison company GEO Group.  Campsfield House was their first European contract.  In 2011 operations at the facility were turned over to Mitie Group PLC. Mitie's contract for Campsfield House expired in June 2019.

Conditions
Detainees at Campsfield House are held behind a  razor wire–topped fence. Throughout the centre there are surveillance cameras, and friends and relatives wishing to visit detainees are searched before passing through five separate remote-controlled doors. Detainees are allowed the use of mobile phones and the establishment can achieve contact through these. Campsfield House is not categorised in the same way as HMP prisons, and would fall short of category 'C' standard. Security of the centre is maintained by large perimeter fences, but within the establishment detainees are relatively free to roam. As opposed to cells detainees have two or three man rooms and communal shower and toilet facilities. There are around fifteen single rooms. The doors to rooms are never locked, however the gates to the three accommodation blocks are locked between midnight and six in the morning. Detainees are free to move around the blocks during this time. This relatively relaxed regime, coupled with the new influx of ex HMP prisoners has led to difficulty in maintaining discipline at Campsfield.

Inspection
Like all Immigration Removal Centres, Campsfield House was regularly inspected by HM Chief Inspector of Prisons.
The last full inspection was in 2014. The Chief Inspector reported: 'This was the latest in a sequence of positive reports about the centre, all of which have found consistent improvement…. Overall, this was a very positive inspection. Staff and managers at Campsfield House should be congratulated in dealing professionally and sensitively with detainees”.

Controversy

Hunger strikes
On 22 June 2005 a group of six Zimbabwean asylum seekers went on hunger strike for three days.

In August 2008, 13 Iraqi Kurds went on hunger strike and were joined by a number of others.

On 3 August 2010, over 100 detainees went on hunger strike in protest at being held for up to three years "no prospect of removal or any evidence of future release".

Suicide
On 27 June 2005, Campsfield detainee Ramazan Komluca, committed suicide, the 19-year-old from Turkey had been detained for about 6 months, and had made three unsuccessful bail applications.

Fires and disturbances

In March 2007, there was a riot at the centre after staff used force to remove a detainee from his room.

On 14 June 2008 a series of small fires broke out at the centre. 10 fire engines, 12 police vehicles and a police helicopter were dispatched to the centre, and a police cordon set up, at the request of the UK Border Agency, to secure the perimeter which is not believed to have been breached.

On 18 October 2013, the centre was damaged by fire. A detainee, Farid Pardiaz, was convicted of arson at Oxford Crown Court and was jailed for 32 months.

Opposition to Campsfield House
The initial establishment of an immigration detention centre at Campsfield House was opposed by the local parish council, however they were overruled by the Home Office. The Campaign to Close Campsfield holds monthly demonstrations outside the premises, using the slogan 'Asylum seekers are not criminals'. They also publish the Campsfield Monitor which gives detainees accounts of what is happening inside the centre.

In the 2010 General Election, Aaron Barschak ran as an independent candidate in the Witney constituency against David Cameron to highlight the plight of asylum seekers and the treatment of people in Campsfield House. At the count he wore a sign around his neck which read "Close Campsfield House". He won 53 votes.

References

Further reading
 Mass escape from detention centre BBC 5 August 2007. "Police arrested 12 of the detainees shortly after the mass escape. ... Police are looking for [another] 14 asylum seekers who escaped from a detention centre after a fire was started there."
 Campsfield's troubled history BBC, 6 August 2007, "There has been a long campaign to close Campsfield House. ... The escape of 26 detainees from Campsfield House in Oxfordshire is the latest in a series of disturbances to hit the immigration removals centre."

Immigration to the United Kingdom
Immigration detention centres and prisons in the United Kingdom
Private prisons in the United Kingdom